Petar Stoimenov (born 8 April 1960) is a Bulgarian boxer. He competed at the 1980 Summer Olympics and the 1988 Summer Olympics.

References

1960 births
Living people
Heavyweight boxers
Super-heavyweight boxers
Bulgarian male boxers
Olympic boxers of Bulgaria
Boxers at the 1980 Summer Olympics
Boxers at the 1988 Summer Olympics
Sportspeople from Sofia
AIBA World Boxing Championships medalists